Oberea denominata is a species of beetle in the family Cerambycidae. It was described by Nikolay Nikolaevich Plavilstshchikov in 1926. It is known from Borneo.

References

denominata
Beetles described in 1926